Getafe, officially the Municipality of Getafe and also spelled as Jetafe, is a 3rd class municipality in the province of Bohol, Philippines. According to the 2020 census, it has a population of 33,422 people.

Getafe also includes the islands of Jandayan (Handayan), Banacon, and the western part of Mahanay. The small islands of Nasingin and Pandanon are considered to be one of the most densely populated islands in the world. The Danajon Bank, the only double barrier reef in the Philippines passes through these islands.

The town of Getafe, Bohol celebrates its feast on the last Saturday of January, to honor the town patron Holy Infant.

Geography

Barangays
Getafe comprises 24 barangays:

Climate

Demographics

Economy

Education

Sister cities

References

External links
 [ Philippine Standard Geographic Code]
Provincial Government of Bohol: Municipality of Getafe

Municipalities of Bohol